The Amnesiac (Italian: Lo smemorato) is a 1936 Italian comedy film directed by Gennaro Righelli and starring Angelo Musco, Checco Durante and Franco Coop. The film's plot is based on a stage play, inspired by the Bruneri-Canella case.

It was shot at Cines Studios in Rome. The film's sets were designed by the art director Mario Rappini.

Cast
 Angelo Musco as Domenico Mondini 
 Checco Durante as L'allenatore Marinoni 
 Franco Coop as Salvatore, l'amministratore 
 Loris Gizzi as Mario Tiana 
 Mario Colli as Nello Salucci 
 Paola Borboni as Erminia Nardelli-Buzzi 
 Amelia Chellini as Agata, la suocera di Domenico 
 Luisa Ferida as Giulietta 
 Pina Renzi as Amalia Mondini, la moglie di Domenico 
 Vittorio Tamagnini as Se stesso
 Renato Alberini as Lo sposino dal 'Club delle Ondine' 
 Giulio Alfieri as Cirillo, il presidente onorario 
 Amelia Amorosi as La presidentessa 
 Virgilio Botti as Giacomozzi 
 Lilla Brignone as La sposina al 'Club delle Ondine'
 Wanda Buratti as Josette 
  as Un'invitata al pranzo 
  as Il medico 
 Eva Magni as La nipote di Erminia
 Ugo Sasso as Un atleta 
 Nietta Zocchi as Zelinda

References

Bibliography
 Goble, Alan. The Complete Index to Literary Sources in Film. Walter de Gruyter, 1999.

External links

The Amnesiac at Variety Distributions

1936 films
1930s Italian-language films
Films directed by Gennaro Righelli
1936 comedy films
Italian comedy films
Cines Studios films
Italian black-and-white films
Films about amnesia
1930s Italian films